Urmançı is a rural locality (a posyolok) in Biektaw District, Tatarstan. The population was 234 as of 2010.

Geography 
Urmançı is located 5 km southwest of Biektaw, district's administrative centre, and 25 km northeast of Qazan, republic's capital, by road.

History 
The village was established in 2001.

Since its establishment is a part of Biektaw district.

References

External links 
 

Rural localities in Vysokogorsky District